María Bernabéu Avomo (born 15 February 1988) is a Spanish judoka of Equatoguinean descent. She currently competes for Spain, which she represented at the 2016 Summer Olympics. She competed in the women's 70 kg event at the 2020 Summer Olympics in Tokyo, Japan.

Personal life
She was born in Salamanca, Spain to an Equatoguinean mother and a Spanish father from Alicante, where she lives.

References

External links
 
 

1988 births
Living people
Sportspeople from Salamanca
Spanish sportspeople of Equatoguinean descent
Spanish female judoka
Judoka at the 2016 Summer Olympics
Olympic judoka of Spain
Spanish evangelicals
Mediterranean Games gold medalists for Spain
Mediterranean Games silver medalists for Spain
Mediterranean Games medalists in judo
Competitors at the 2018 Mediterranean Games
European Games competitors for Spain
Judoka at the 2015 European Games
Judoka at the 2019 European Games
Judoka at the 2020 Summer Olympics